Scar literature or literature of the wounded is a genre of Chinese literature which emerged in the late 1970s during the "Boluan Fanzheng" period, soon after the death of Mao Zedong, portraying the sufferings of cadres and intellectuals during the experiences of the Cultural Revolution and the rule of the Gang of Four.

Historical background 
During the Boluan Fanzheng period, the growth of scar literature corresponded with the Beijing Spring, a period of greater openness in Chinese society; scar literature has even been described as a "second Hundred Flowers Movement". Though scar literature focuses on trauma and oppression, and has been described as largely negative, love and faith remained its major themes; its practitioners were typically not opposed to Communism, but on the converse retained faith in the ability of the Party to rectify past tragedies, and "embraced love as a key to solving social problems". Regardless, though their writing was hailed as marking a revival of the tradition of socialist realism in the arts, it in fact represented a break from that tradition, as it was no longer subject to party control, and was not under an obligation to serve the purpose of political education for the masses.

Unlike the mass revolutionary art of the Great Proletarian Cultural Revolution, scar literature adopted a more individualist and market-driven literary style.

Examples 
The first exemplar of the genre is generally agreed to be Lu Xinhua's 1978 story "Scar", which attacked official hypocrisy and corruption. Liu Xinwu's 1977 short story "The Class Monitor" has also been described as the pioneer of scar literature, though this assessment is disputed.

Most of the representative authors were in their thirties and forties at the time; they worked as salaried writers and editors, and published their works in state-sponsored literary journals. The moral outrage they expressed in their works resonated with the public, contributing to its popularity.

Not all works by authors who lived through the Cultural Revolution can be classified as scar literature. Zhang Chengzhi in particular is notable for his idealism regarding his experiences during the Cultural Revolution; his works such as Black Steed and Rivers of the North have been described as rebuttals to the "negativism of scar literature".

Responses 
However, scar literature did not entirely receive a free pass from the Party establishment; due to its criticisms of the Communist Party and of Mao himself, as well as its exposure of social problems, it came under attack by conservatives as early as 1979. Events such as the trial of Wei Jingsheng signalled writers that there were limits to the open discussion of the past errors of the Party, and after the end of the trial of the Gang of Four, the political climate chilled significantly. Eventually, the government began to crack down on scar literature as part of a wider campaign against "bourgeois liberalism". Deng Xiaoping himself provided major support for the campaign, even though his return to Chinese politics after his earlier disgrace and his political victory over rival Hua Guofeng relied heavily on the repudiation of Maoism inherent in scar literature, and its influence on public opinion. The campaign against scar literature was itself unusual in that, unlike earlier campaigns against liberalism, official criticisms were generally limited to attacks on its content, rather than denunciations of individuals.

See also 

 Cultural Revolution
 Boluan Fanzheng
 Reform and Opening-up

References

Citations

Sources 

 
 
 
 
 
 
 
 
 
 

Chinese literary genres
Cultural Revolution
Literary genres
Cold War history of China
Persecution of intellectuals